Donald Waldhelm (born March 17, 1939 in the Gerritsen Beach neighborhood of Brooklyn, New York) was a professional heavyweight boxer. He was best known for being George Foreman's first professional opponent.

He also won the light heavyweight Golden Gloves in 1964. He beat James Joyner on the three knockdown rule in amateur boxing.

References

Heavyweight boxers
Boxers from New York (state)
Living people
1939 births
American male boxers